Yeun Savuth (born August 19, 1993) is a male singer in Cambodia. He records for Cambodian production company Rasmey Hang Meas. He started his career as a singer in 2015. Many people known him as well after he showed his talent in The Voice Cambodia.



Discography

Solo albums
 2014: Stung Treng Meas Bong Ery
 2015: Yeak Laom Banlung
 2016: Socheata Meas Bong
 2017: Tuek Phos Sneh Knhom

Films
 2016: Kromon Siem Reap
 2017: Love Story at Olympic Stadium

TV Show
 The Voice Cambodia (season 1) 2014 on Hang Meas HDTV
 Cambodia's Got Talent (season 1) 2015 on Hang Meas HDTV
 Cambodian Idol (season 1) 2015 on Hang Meas HDTV

References
 នេះនែ!...បេក្ខភាព Cambodia's Got Talent ត្រូវប្រកួតវគ្គផ្ដាច់ព្រ័ត្រយប់នេះ. Retrieved February 2, 2015.
 ព្រាប សុវត្ថិ ខាត់ សុឃីម និងនាយ កុយ ចាប់ដៃគ្នាជាគណកម្មការ ក្នុងកម្មវិធី Cambodia's Got Talent. Retrieved June 14, 2014.
 បទសម្ភាសន៍ជាមួយម្ចាស់ពាន Cambodian Idol. Retrieved November 3, 2015.

External links
Photo Gallery
Khmer Magazines and Books
Yeun Savuth on Facebook

21st-century Cambodian male singers
1993 births
People from Kampong Cham province
Living people